Parker Boudreaux (born March 9, 1998) is an American professional wrestler. He is currently signed to  the American promotion All Elite Wrestling (AEW), where he is part of the Mogul Affiliates stable.

Professional wrestling career 
Noted by his resemblance to Brock Lesnar, Boudreaux signed a development contract with WWE in 2021. Boudreaux made his debut under the ring name Harland on December 14, 2021, at NXT, defeating Guru Raaj. He worked in NXT during the next 4 months, where he joined Joe Gacy, until his release on April 29, 2022.

After his release, Boudreaux worked a few matches with Major League Wrestling. He also began to appear on All Elite Wrestling's programs AEW Dark, AEW Dark: Elevation and AEW Rampage with Ari Daivari and Slim J as part of a stable named The Trustbusters. In August, he signed a contract with AEW.

References

External links 
 
 

1998 births
21st-century professional wrestlers
All Elite Wrestling personnel
American male professional wrestlers
Living people
Professional wrestlers from Florida
Notre Dame Fighting Irish football players
UCF Knights football players